Jalagam Prasada Rao is a former Indian Politician elected to Andhra Pradesh State Legislative Assembly from Sathupalli. He served as Panchayat Raj Minister during United Andhra Pradesh. He is the eldest son of former chief minister of united Andhra Pradesh, Jalagam Vengala Rao. He was elected to the Assembly from Sathupali constituency from Indian National Congress.

Political career 
He was elected to the Andhra Pradesh Legislative Assembly two times during the year 1983 and 1989 general elections from Sathupalli constituency. He served as Minister of Small Scale Industries and Panchayat Raj. He was elected from Indian National Congress.

References

External links 
 Information of Andhra Pradesh Cabinet Ministers 

People from Telangana
Telugu people
Indian National Congress politicians
Living people
Year of birth missing (living people)